Dasynotus is a monotypic genus of flowering plants belonging to the family Boraginaceae, it only contains one known species, Dasynotus daubenmirei I.M.Johnst..

Its native range is north-western USA and it is only found in Idaho.

The genus and species were circumscribed by Ivan Murray Johnston in J. Arnold Arbor. vol.29 on page 233 in 1948.

It has the common name of 'Daubenmire's Dasynotus'.

The Latin specific epithet of daubenmirei is in honour of Dr Rexford Daubenmire (1909- ), an American ecologist that went to the University of Minnesota, where he was taught by William Skinner Cooper (1884–1978), among his fellow students at Minnesota were Henry J. Oosting, Murray Fife Buell and Frank Edwin Egler.

Dasynotus has a unique morphology, when compared to other species of the Boraginaceae family, as it has large white salverform (composed of united petals forming a tube that spreads at the open end) corollas with long horn-like faucal appendages and large nutlets covered with sparse trichomes (hairs).

References

Boraginaceae
Boraginaceae genera
Flora of Idaho
Garden plants of North America
Plants described in 1948